Nathaniel Matheson Gorton (born July 25, 1938) is an American lawyer who has served as a judge of the United States District Court for the District of Massachusetts since 1992.

Early life and early legal career
Gorton was born in 1938 in Evanston, Illinois, the son of Ruth (Israel) and Thomas Slade Gorton, Jr. His elder brother was Slade Gorton, who later became a U.S. Senator for Washington state.

Gorton received an Artium Baccalaureus degree from Dartmouth College in 1960, and a Bachelor of Laws from Columbia Law School in 1966. He was in the United States Navy from 1960 to 1962, where he was a Lieutenant Junior Grade, and an executive officer on the USS Banner (AKL-25) in the Western Pacific Ocean.

Gorton worked in private practice in Boston from 1966 to 1992, where he was an associate in the trial and business departments at Nutter McClennen & Fish until 1969, an associate at Powers & Hall PC from 1970 to 1974 and a partner at the latter firm from 1975 until 1992, practicing civil business litigation.

Federal judicial service

On April 28, 1992, Gorton was nominated by President George H. W. Bush to a new seat on the United States District Court for the District of Massachusetts created by Section 203(a)(14) of the Civil Justice Reform Act of 1990. He was confirmed by the United States Senate on September 23, 1992, and received his commission the following day. In 2015 Gorton received the Federal Bar Association, Massachusetts chapter, Recognition Award for dedication and service.

According to the USA Today in April 2019, Gorton "has a reputation for issuing stronger sentences than his peers," while Law360 stated that he "has a reputation for being a no-nonsense, fairly conservative judge." He presided over the sentencing of many parents indicted in the 2019 College admissions bribery scandal, most notably, actress Lori Loughlin and her husband, fashion designer Mossimo Giannulli, which saw the two of them sentenced to two months and five months in prison respectively.

Other activities
Gorton is a former Chair of the Board of Trustees of Buckingham Browne & Nichols School, an independent co-educational day school in Cambridge, Massachusetts, with students from pre-kindergarten through 12th grade.

References

Sources

External links
"Know Your Judge: Nathaniel M. Gorton," May 2, 2018.
"Judge Nathaniel M. Gorton," at the Transactional Records Access Clearinghouse (TRAC) of Syracuse University

1938 births
Living people
People from Evanston, Illinois
Military personnel from Illinois
Lawyers from Boston
Dartmouth College alumni
Columbia Law School alumni
Judges of the United States District Court for the District of Massachusetts
United States district court judges appointed by George H. W. Bush
20th-century American judges
United States Navy sailors
Judges of the United States Foreign Intelligence Surveillance Court
21st-century American judges